Year 1389 (MCCCLXXXIX) was a common year starting on Friday (link will display full calendar) of the Julian calendar.

Events 
 January–December 
 February 24 – Queen Margaret of Norway and Denmark defeats Albert, King of Sweden in battle and becomes ruler of all three kingdoms. Albert is deposed from the Swedish throne and taken prisoner.
 May 3 – Richard II takes control of England, away from the Lords Appellant.
 May 19 – Vasili I becomes Grand Prince of Moscow after the death of his father, Dmitry Donskoy.
 June – The Käpplinge murders take place in Stockholm in Sweden. 
 June 15 – Battle of Kosovo: The Ottoman Empire and the Serbs fight an inconclusive battle with both sides suffering heavy losses. Both Sultan Murad I and Serbian Prince Lazar are killed in the battle. 
Bayezid I (1389–1402) succeeds his father Murad I (1362–1389), as Ottoman Sultan.
 Stefan III succeeds his father, as ruler of Serbia.
 July 18 – Hundred Years' War: The kingdoms of England and France sign the Truce of Leulinghem, ending the second phase of the war, and bringing a 13-year peace.
 November 2 – Pope Boniface IX succeeds Pope Urban VI, as the 203rd pope.

 Date unknown 
 Mircea I of Wallachia and Polish king Władysław II Jagiełło sign their first treaty, to protect their countries against Ottoman expansion.
 Goryeo Revolution in Korea (1388–1392): King Chang of Goryeo is forced from power and replaced by King Gongyang. The ten-year-old Chang and his predecessor, U, are both assassinated later in the year.
 Hadji II is restored as Mamluk Sultan of Egypt, after overthrowing Sultan Barquq.
 With the backing of Antipope John XXIII, supporters of Louis II overthrow the underage King Ladislaus as King of Naples. The new Pope Boniface IX recognises Ladislaus's claim to the throne.
 Wikramawardhana succeeds Hayam Wuruk, as ruler of the Majapahit Empire.
 The unpopular Sultan Tughluq Khan of Delhi is murdered and succeeded by his brother, Abu Bakr Shah.
 Biri II succeeds Kade Alunu as King of the Kanem-Bornu Empire (now eastern Chad and Nigeria), and the Empire loses its land in present-day Chad to the Bilala.
 Sandaki overthrows Magha II, as Mansa of the Mali Empire.
 Abd ar-Rahmân II succeeds Musa II as ruler of the Ziyanid Dynasty, in present-day western Algeria.
 Abu Tashufin II succeeds his nephew, Abu Hammu II, as ruler of the Abdalwadid Dynasty in present-day eastern Algeria.
 Carmo Convent is built in Lisbon, Portugal.

Births 
 March 1 – Antoninus of Florence, Italian archbishop (d. 1459)
 June 20 – John of Lancaster, 1st Duke of Bedford, regent of England (d. 1435)
 April 10 – Cosimo de' Medici, ruler of Florence (d. 1464)
 November 9 – Isabella of Valois, queen consort of England (d. 1409)
 December 5 – Zbigniew Oleśnicki, Polish cardinal and statesman (d. 1455)
 December 24 – John VI, Duke of Brittany (d. 1442)

Deaths 
 March 14 – Ghiyas-ud-Din Tughluq II, Sultan of Delhi (murdered)
 May 19 – Dmitry Donskoy, Grand Prince of Muscovy (b. 1350)
 June 15 (in the Battle of Kosovo)
 Prince Lazar, Prince of Serbia (b. 1329)
 Murad I, Ottoman Sultan (b. 1326)
 Miloš Obilić, Serbian knight
 October 15 – Pope Urban VI (b. 1318)
 December 31 (assassination)
 Chang of Goryeo, deposed Korean king (b. 1381)
 U of Goryeo, Korean king (b. 1365)
 date unknown
 Isabella, Countess of Fife, Scottish noblewoman (b. 1320)
 Hayam Wuruk, ruler of the Majapahit Empire (b. 1334)
 Ignatius Saba I, Syriac Orthodox Patriarch of Tur Abdin.

References